Heddeland is a village in Lindesnes municipality in Agder county, Norway. Historically, the village was the administrative centre of the old municipality of Marnardal.

References

Villages in Agder
Lindesnes